The William C. Davol Jr. House is a historic house located at 252 High Street in Fall River, Massachusetts.

Description and history 
It was built in 1876 for William C. Davol Jr., treasurer of the Davol Mills. The house was designed by Boston architects Hartwell & Swasey, who works included numerous other public buildings and private homes in Fall River during this period.

The house has the characteristic asymmetrical massing and irregular silhouette of Stick/Eastlake architecture and retains its peaked entrance porch, original carved double-leaved entrance doors, stained glass window, slate roof and copper coping and finials, The interior is richly embellished with Minton tiles and Eastlakian trim and sports an original water-power elevator.

The house was added to the National Register of Historic Places in 1983. It is also located within the Lower Highlands Historic District.

See also
National Register of Historic Places listings in Fall River, Massachusetts

References

Houses in Fall River, Massachusetts
National Register of Historic Places in Fall River, Massachusetts
Historic district contributing properties in Massachusetts
Houses on the National Register of Historic Places in Bristol County, Massachusetts
Houses completed in 1876